The Lower Guinean forests is region of coastal tropical moist broadleaf forest in West Africa, extending along the eastern coast of the Gulf of Guinea from eastern Benin through Nigeria and Cameroon.

The Dahomey Gap, a region of savanna and dry forest in Togo and Benin, divides the Lower Guinean forests from the Upper Guinean forests to the west, which extend along the western coast of the Gulf of Guinea from Togo to Liberia and north to Guinea.

To the north and northeast, the Lower Guinean forests transition to the drier inland Guinean forest–savanna mosaic and Northern Congolian forest–savanna mosaic and to the southeast by the Congolian Coastal forests, whose boundary is the Sanaga River in Cameroon.

The Lower Guinean forests share many biotic affinities with the Upper Guinean forests. They are collectively known as the Guinean Forests of West Africa.

Ecoregions
The World Wide Fund for Nature (WWF) divides the Lower Guinean forests into a number of distinct ecoregions:

 Nigerian lowland forests (Togo, Nigeria)
 Niger Delta swamp forests (Nigeria)
 Cross–Niger transition forests (Nigeria)
 Cross–Sanaga–Bioko coastal forests (Nigeria, Cameroon, Equatorial Guinea)
 Cameroonian Highlands forests (Nigeria, Cameroon)
 Mount Cameroon and Bioko montane forests (Cameroon, Equatorial Guinea)
 São Tomé, Príncipe, and Annobón moist lowland forests (Equatorial Guinea, São Tomé and Príncipe)

The WWF has designated two regions of the Lower Guinean forests as Global 200 priority regions for conservation. The WWF's "Coastal Congolian forests" region includes the Cross-Sanaga Bioko coastal forests, São Tomé and Príncipe moist lowland forests, and Atlantic Equatorial coastal forests ecoregions. The "Cameroon Highlands forests" Global 200 region includes the Cameroonian Highlands forests and the Mount Cameroon and Bioko montane forests ecoregions.

See also
 Congolian forests

References

External links
Guinean Forests of West Africa, at Critical Ecosystem Partnership Fund.
Coastal areas of Guinea, Cote d'Ivoire, Liberia, and Sierra Leone at World Wildlife Fund.

Afrotropical realm
Tropical and subtropical moist broadleaf forests